Courage Brewery was an English brewery, founded by John Courage in 1787 in London, England.

History
Courage & Co Ltd was started by John Courage at the Anchor Brewhouse in Horsleydown, Bermondsey in 1787. He was a Scottish shipping agent of French Huguenot descent. It became Courage & Donaldson in 1797. By 1888, it had been registered simply as Courage. In 1955, the company merged with Barclay, Perkins & Co Ltd (who were located at the nearby Anchor Brewery) to become Courage, Barclay & Co Ltd. Only five years later another merger with the Reading based Simonds Brewery led to the name changing to Courage, Barclay, Simonds & Co Ltd. In 1961, Georges Bristol Brewery was acquired. By the late 1960s, the group had assets of approximately £100m, and operated five breweries in London, Reading, Bristol, Plymouth and Newark-on-Trent. It owned some 5,000 licensed premises spread over the whole of Southern England, a large part of South Wales and an extensive area of the East Midlands and South Yorkshire. Its name was simplified to Courage Ltd in October 1970 and the company was taken over by the Imperial Tobacco Group Ltd two years later.

Its vast Worton Grange (later the Berkshire) brewery was opened on the Reading/Shinfield border in 1978. The Anchor Brewery closed in 1981 and all brewing was transferred to Reading. Imperial Tobacco was acquired by the Hanson Trust in 1986 and it sold off Courage to Elders IXL who were renamed the Foster's Brewing Group in 1990. The following year the Courage section of Foster's merged with the breweries of Grand Metropolitan. Its public houses were owned by a joint-company called Inntrepreneur Estates. Scottish & Newcastle purchased Courage from Foster's in 1995, creating Scottish Courage as its brewing arm.

In January 2007, the rights for the production, marketing and sales of the Courage brands were sold to Wells & Young's Brewing Company of Bedford which reverted to Charles Wells, once Wells bought out Young's shares in the venture. This is managed by a venture called Courage Brands Ltd. Heineken retained a 17 per cent stake in the venture until 2011, when Wells & Young's acquired complete control. The Berkshire Brewery closed in April 2010. Courage Best has undergone a significant decline in sales from almost 421,000 hectolitres (9.3 million gallons) in 2003 to under 142,000 hectolitres (3.1 million gallons) in 2012. The decline of Courage Directors has levelled off at around 60,000 hectolitres (1.3 million gallons), which is down from 140,000 hectolitres (3.1 million gallons) in 2003. Wells & Young's reintroduced the historic brew, Courage Imperial Russian Stout, which was first brewed in the 18th century by Thrale's brewery; but this has mainly proved to be produced for distribution in the US, with limited amounts available in the UK.
In 2017, Marston's Brewery acquired the brand as part of its acquisition of Charles Wells's Eagle Brewery.

Beers

Beers bearing the Courage name include:
Courage Best Bitter (4 percent ABV in cask and keg, 3.8 percent in bottles and cans). It is described as "pale in colour, fully balanced with a malty flavour and distinctive hop character, [and] makes for an easy drinking session beer". Courage Best Bitter sponsors local events within its south west of England heartland. It remains one of the UK's top ten ales.
Courage Directors (4.8 percent ABV in cask, keg, bottles and cans). Available in cask, bottles and cans. Courage Directors was originally brewed at the Alton brewery under the name of Alton Red and was served exclusively in the Courage's Directors dining rooms. Following the suggestion of Courage's director Peter Rowe, Alton Red was renamed Directors Bitter and marketed to the general public. It is described as "full bodied with a clean, bitter taste, balanced with a sweet burnt, malty and fruity notes with a distinctive dry-hop aroma and flavour". It has a strong following in London and the South East, and across the UK as a whole remains in the top ten premium cask ales, and the top twenty bottled ales. It is brewed with English Target hops, burnt Pale and Crystal malts.
Courage Dark Mild (3 percent) A mild ale available in keg form only.
Courage Light Ale (3.2 percent) 10 fl oz bottles often used to make "light and bitter" with Courage Best Bitter.
Courage Imperial Russian Stout (10 percent) (retired 2003, reinstated 2011)
Courage Velvet Stout (5 percent)
Courage 1945 Ale (5 percent) (retired)
Courage Ceremonial Ale (4.8 percent) (retired)
Courage Directors Winter Warmer (5.5 percent) (retired)

Beers bearing the John Courage name include:
John Courage (4.7 percent) (retired) Bitter.
John Courage Amber (unknown percentage) (retired) Bitter/Amber Ale.
John Courage Export Lager (unknown percentage) (retired)
John Courage Strong Pale Ale (4.2 percent) (retired)

Advertising
Since the 1950s the brewery used the slogan "Take Courage"

The Rockney duo Chas & Dave's songs "Gertcha", "The Sideboard Song", "Rabbit", "What a miserable Saturday Night", "That's what I like" and "Margate" were adapted for a series of television commercials for Courage Bitter shown in the South of England in the 1980s. Also, the Director's Bitter is a favourite of the British television character Alan Partridge. He shares this passion during his short-lived friendship with Dan, who states that he has it 'coming out of his taps' in the episode "Brave Alan".

Sponsorship
The brewery sponsored Reading FC from 1984 until 1990. Courage sponsored the English Premiership rugby union league for ten years from 1987 until 1997. Courage Best Bitter is a sponsor of rugby union club the Exeter Chiefs.

References

British companies established in 1787
Defunct breweries of the United Kingdom
1787 establishments in England
Food and drink companies established in 1787